William Barron (1837 – 16 June 1916) was a 19th-century Member of Parliament from Dunedin, New Zealand.

Born in St Andrews, Scotland in 1837, Barron arrived in New Zealand in 1851. He first spent time as a miner and merchant on the Otago goldfields before engaging in business in Dunedin. He served as Grand Master of the New Zealand Lodge of Freemasons.

He represented the Caversham electorate from 1879 to 1890, when he retired.

References

1837 births
1916 deaths
People from St Andrews
Scottish emigrants to New Zealand
New Zealand businesspeople
New Zealand MPs for Dunedin electorates
Members of the New Zealand House of Representatives
Independent MPs of New Zealand
New Zealand Freemasons
Burials at Dunedin Northern Cemetery
Unsuccessful candidates in the 1890 New Zealand general election
19th-century New Zealand politicians